This is a list of Danish television related events from 2014.

Events
8 March - X Factor season 1 contestant Basim is selected to represent Denmark at the 2014 Eurovision Song Contest with his song "Cliché Love Song". He is selected to be the forty-second Danish Eurovision entry during Dansk Melodi Grand Prix held at the Arena Fyn in Odense.
28 March - Anthony Jasmin win the seventh season of X Factor, becoming the show's first group to emerge as winners.
27 April - David Feldstedt wins the sixth and final season of Big Brother.
10 May - The 59th Eurovision Song Contest is held at the B&W Hallerne in Copenhagen. Austria wins the contest with the song "Rise Like a Phoenix", performed by Conchita Wurst.
23 May - 13-year-old Malina wins the first season of Voice Junior.
22 November - 14-year-old Åland wins the second season of Voice Junior.
28 November - Go' Morgen Danmark weather-girl Sara Maria Franch-Mærkedahl and her partner Silas Holst win the eleventh season of Vild med dans.

Debuts
29 December - Danmark har talent (2014–present)

Television shows

1990s
Hvem vil være millionær? (1999–present)

2000s
Vild med dans (2005–present)
X Factor (2008–present)

2010s
Voice – Danmarks største stemme (2011–present)

Ending this year
Big Brother (2001-2005, 2012-2014)

Births

Deaths

See also
 2014 in Denmark